The Champasak Stadium or Champassack Stadium is a football stadium in Pakse, Laos. It is the home of Champasak F.C and it is located just north of the Daoruang Market. It has blue and green tribunes and a proper running track around the field. The stadium is sometimes used for ceremonies and concerts. in 2010, when it had a seating capacity of 5,000, it was expanded. The stadium now holds up to 12,000 people. The stadium is named after the region Champasak, of which Pakse is the capital, Laos PDR.

External links 
 Fussballtempel: Stadiums in Laos
 World Stadiums: Stadiums in Laos

Football venues in Laos
Buildings and structures in Champasak province
2010 establishments in Laos